Liu Ruilin (Chinese: 刘芮麟; born 6 October 1990 in Beijing, China), also known as Wayne Liu, is a Chinese actor who graduated from the Beijing Film Academy. He is best known for his supporting roles in the hit ancient dramas Eternal Love and The Flame's Daughter, as well as the romantic comedy film Go Away Mr. Tumor.

Filmography

Film

Television series

Discography

Awards and nominations

References

Living people
1990 births
Chinese male television actors
Chinese male film actors
21st-century Chinese male actors
Male actors from Beijing
Beijing Film Academy alumni
Jay Walk Studio